Junagarh is a Vidhan Sabha constituency of Kalahandi district, Odisha, India.

This constituency includes Junagarh, Junagarh block and Golamunda block.

In 2014 election, Biju Janata Dal candidate Captain Dibya Shankar Mishra defeated Indian National Congress candidate Gobardhan Dash by a margin of 17,728 votes.

Elected Members

Fourteen elections were held between 1951 and 2019.
Elected members from the Junagarh constituency are:

2019: (78): Dibya Shankar Mishra(BJD)
2014: (78): Dibya Shankar Mishra(BJD)
2009: (78): Gobardhan Dash (Congress)
2004: (98): Himanshu Shekhar Meher (BJP) 
2000: (98): Himanshu Shekhar Meher (BJP)
1995: (98): Bikram Keshari Deo (BJP)
1990: (98): Bikram Keshari Deo (BJP)
1985: (98): Bikram Keshari Deo (Janata Party)
1980: (98): Maheshwar Barad (Congress-I)
1977: (98): Maheshwar Barad (Congress)
1974: (98): Udit Pratap Deo (Swatantra Party)
1971: (92): Trinath Sarab (Swatantra Party)
1967: (92): Maheswar Naik (Swatantra Party)
1961: (37): Maheswar Naik (Ganatantra Parishad)
1951: (20): P. K. Deo (Ganatantra Parishad)

2019 Election Result

2014 Election Result

2009 Election Result

Notes

External links 
 Discover Junagarh

References

Assembly constituencies of Odisha
Kalahandi district